A horse name is a secondary noble title or a popular name for members of Ethiopian royalty; in some cases the "horse names" are the only name known for a ruler. They take the form of "father of X", where "X" is the name of the person's warhorse. 

Some known horse names of Ethiopian nobility include:

Bibliography
 Mehari, Krista. 2007. Throne names, pen names, horse names, and field names: A look at the significance of name change in the Ethiopian political sphere. 
 Pankhurst, Richard. 1989. The Early History of Ethiopian Horse-Names. Paideuma 35, pp. 197–206. 
 Mahatama-Sellasie Walda-Masqal. 1969. A Study of the Ethiopian Culture of Horse Names. Journal of Ethiopian Studies Vol. 7, No. 2, pp

Notes

References

Ethiopian culture
Equestrianism
Horse history and evolution
Names by culture
Titles